Edgardo Boeninger Kausel (born 23 August 1925−13 September 2009) was a Chilean politician who served as minister.

Biography

Early life
Born in Santiago de Chile as Edgar Arnold Dagmar Hanz Heinz Böninger Kausel, his parents were Edgar Böninger and Isabel Kausel, who married in October 1924. He had no siblings. When he was ten, his mother left the house tired of a violent husband, so since then Boeninger lived in pensions. His father also left home when he was a teenager.

As a child attended The Grange School, Santiago. Then he was a member of the Instituto Nacional General José Miguel Carrera and later at the Alonso de Ercilla Institute in Santiago, belonging to the Congregation of the Marist Brothers, where he would finish the High School in 1941.

He studied civil engineering at the Pontifical Catholic University of Chile, obtaining his Bachelor of Arts in 1950.

He actively devoted himself to teaching at the university where he studied, as a professor of geometry and stability at the Faculty of Architecture. Then, in 1955−1960, he finished his Master of Arts in economy at the University of Chile.

From 1951 to 1961, he was a traffic engineer for the Municipality of Santiago.

Political career

Close to Frei and oppositor to Pinochet

From 1964 to 1969, Boeninger entered the State of Chile as Director of Budgets for President Eduardo Frei Montalva (1964−70). Then he taught, becoming dean of the Faculty of Economic Sciences of the University of Chile in 1965. Later, in 1969, he was elected as rector of that university, position he held until the 1973 military coup.

During the military regime −and still member of the Christian Democratic Party− Boeninger studied political science at the University of California, Los Angeles (1975). Then, he was CEO of the Rural Financial System of Chile (1977−82) and director of the Center for Development Studies (1984−87).

From 1987 to 1989, he was vice president of the his party, helping in the formation of the Concertación de Partidos Por el No.

References

External links
 BCN Profile

1925 births
2009 deaths
Chilean people of German descent
20th-century Chilean politicians
21st-century Chilean politicians
Instituto Nacional General José Miguel Carrera alumni
University of Chile alumni
Pontifical Catholic University of Chile alumni
University of California, Los Angeles alumni
Christian Democratic Party (Chile) politicians
Heads of universities in Chile
Politicians from Santiago
Heads of the University of Chile